

Incumbents
 President: Julio Argentino Roca

Governors
 Buenos Aires Province: Bernardo de Irigoyen
 Cordoba: Donaciano del Campillo then José Manuel Álvarez 
 Mendoza Province: Jacinto Álvarez then Elías Villanueva

Vice Governors
 Buenos Aires Province: Alfredo Demarchi

Events
25 March - The Argentine Regional Workers' Federation, a syndicalist movement, is founded.
17 May - José Manuel Álvarez becomes Governor of Córdoba.
December - Scientist José María Sobral joins the Swedish Antarctic Expedition in Buenos Aires, thus becoming the first Argentine to set foot on Antarctica.

Births
25 January - Martín de Álzaga, Argentinian race car driver and pilot (d. 1982)
17 April - Raúl Prebisch, economist (died 1986)
2 December - Raimundo Orsi, footballer (died 1986)

Deaths
23 August - Enrique Tornú, physician and hygienist (born 1865)

References

 
History of Argentina (1880–1916)
Years of the 20th century in Argentina